The fez, also called tarboosh/tarboush (derived from ), is a felt headdress in the shape of a short cylindrical, truncated (peakless) hat, usually red, and sometimes with a black tassel attached to the top. The name "fez" refers to the Moroccan city of Fez, where the dye to color the hat was extracted from crimson berries. However, its origins are disputed.

The modern fez owes much of its popularity to the Ottoman era. The fez became a symbol of the Ottoman Empire in the early 19th century. In 1827, Mahmud II mandated the fez as a modern headdress for his new army, the Asakir-i Mansure-i Muhammediye. The decision was inspired by the Ottoman naval command, who had previously returned from the Maghreb having embraced the style. In 1829, Mahmud issued new regulations mandating use of the fez by all civil and religious officials. The intention was to replace the turban, which acted as a marker of identity and so divided rather than unified the population. The fez was subsequently outlawed in Turkey in 1925 as part of Atatürk's reforms.

The fez has been used as part of soldiers' uniforms in many armies and wars for centuries, including the Bahawalpur Regiment in Pakistan as late as the 1960s.

It is still worn in parts of south Asia, the Middle East, North Africa, and in Cape Town, South Africa. It has also been adopted by various fraternal orders.

Etymology
The fez, is also known as a tarboosh, also spelt tarboush. Tarboosh is considered to be a Turkish word composed of two elements, ter "sweat" and pošu "a light turban cloth".

The Turkish fez got its name from the Moroccan city of Fez, this is because it was the source of the crimson berry once used to dye the felt.

History

The origins of the hat are obscure. It is either of ancient Greek, Tunisian, Moroccan or Turkish origin. It was popular especially during the later period of the Ottoman Empire and its use spread throughout the empire, and much of its popularity derives from this era.

Initially, the fez was a brimless red, white, or black bonnet over which a turban was wrapped (similar to a wrapped keffiyeh). Later the turban was eliminated, the bonnet shortened, and the color fixed to red. Praying while wearing a fez—instead of a headdress with brim—was easier because Muslims put their heads to the ground during Salah (daily prayers).

The tarboosh was depicted as an element of Turkish clothing as early as around 1460. Mehmed the Conqueror wore a jeweled tarboosh wrapped in a white sarık to signify his right of the conquest of Constantinople. In 1826, Sultan Mahmud II of the Ottoman Empire suppressed the Janissaries and began sweeping reforms of the military. The modernised military adopted Western style uniforms and, as headdresses, the fez with a cloth wrapped around it. In 1827, 50,000 fezzes were ordered from Tunis for the sultan's troops. In 1829 the Sultan ordered his civil officials to wear the plain fez, and banned the wearing of turbans. The intention was to coerce the populace at large to update to the fez, and the plan was successful. This was a radically egalitarian measure, which replaced the elaborate sumptuary laws that signaled rank, religion, and occupation, foreshadowing the Tanzimat reforms. Although tradesmen and artisans generally rejected the fez, it became a symbol of modernity throughout the Near East, inspiring similar decrees in other nations (such as Iran in 1873).

The original centre of production appears to have been in Tunis. To meet escalating demand, skilled fez makers were induced to immigrate from Tunisia to Istanbul, where factories were established in the neighborhood of Eyüp. Styles soon multiplied, with nuances of shape, height, material, and hue competing in the market. The striking scarlet and merlot colors of the fez were initially achieved through an extract of cornel. However, the invention of low-cost synthetic dyes soon shifted production of the hat to the factories of Strakonice, Czech Republic (then in the Austrian Empire).

The 1908 Austro-Hungarian annexation of Bosnia-Herzegovina resulted in a boycott of Austrian goods, which became known as the "Fez Boycott" due to the near-monopoly the Austrians then held on the production of the hat. Although the headdress survived, the year-long boycott brought the end of its universality in the Ottoman Empire as other styles became socially acceptable.

The societal position of the fez as a symbol of tradition led to its ban in Turkey in 1925 by Mustafa Kemal Atatürk in the Hat Revolution, part of his modernizing reforms. It was banned for similar reasons in 1958 in Egypt by Gamal Abdel Nasser government, with Cairo having been one of the most important centers of production of the fez up until then. Fez production has subsequently resumed in Egypt, but its sale is largely aimed at tourists.

Symbolism 

The fez was a symbol not only of Ottoman affiliation but also of religious adherence to Islam. It was also the main headdress for Christians and Jews during the Ottoman Empire. Jewish men wore the fez and referred to it by the Arabic name "Tarboush", especially if they spoke Arabic (Egyptian, Syrian and Palestinian Jews). In southern Asia, the fez had been adopted due to its links with the Ottoman Empire.

Through the 19th and early 20th centuries the fez was the preferred headwear for Christians and Muslims in the Balkans, which at the time was still mostly under Ottoman suzerainty. There were variations on the fez in the Balkan states, mainly involving the addition of religious symbols on the front. In semi-independent Montenegro, a client state of the Ottoman Empire that enjoyed complete autonomy, its Orthodox citizens wore their fezzes with a Greek cross on the front. Supporters of the Illyrian movement among South Slavs, especially in Croatia, wore their fezzes with a star and crescent on the front irrespective of religion, believing that the symbol predated the introduction of Islam in the Balkans. In 1850, regulations in the newly-autonomous Principality of Serbia concerning uniforms of ministerial officers specified the wear of red fezzes displaying the Serbian coat of arms.

Over time, the fez came to be seen as part of an Oriental cultural identity. On the one hand this led to its banning as part of modernising reforms in Turkey (1928) and later in Egypt (1958). On the other hand, the western orientalist perception of it during the 20th century west as exotic and romantic lead to its vogue as part of men's luxury smoking outfit in the United States and the United Kingdom. It had also become associated with Ottoman domination across much of the former Ottoman empire, though an exception is Morocco, where it became a symbol against French colonisation. Morocco remains one of the last places where the fez is occasionally worn, and remains a favoured part of royal court dress.

Military use

A version of the fez was used as an arming cap for the 1400–1700s version of the mail armor head protector (a round metal plate or skull-cap, around which hung a curtain of mail to protect the neck and upper shoulder). The red fez with blue tassel was the standard headdress of the Turkish Army from the 1840s until the introduction of a khaki service dress and peakless sun helmet in 1910. The only significant exceptions were cavalry and some artillery units who wore a lambskin hat with colored cloth tops. Albanian levies wore a white version of the fez, resembling their traditional qeleshe. During World War I the fez was still worn by some naval reserve units and occasionally by soldiers when off duty.  The Evzones (light infantry) regiments of the Greek Army wore their own distinctive version of the fez from 1837 until World War II. It now survives in the parade uniform of the Presidential Guard in Athens.

From the mid-19th century on, the fez was widely adopted as the headdress of locally recruited "native" soldiers among the various colonial troops of the world. The French North African regiments (Zouaves, Tirailleurs, and Spahis) wore wide, red fezzes with detachable tassels of various colors. It was an off-duty affectation of the Zouaves to wear their fezzes at different angles according to the regiment; French officers of North African units during the 1930s often wore the same fez as their men, with rank insignia attached. (Many volunteer Zouave regiments wore the French North African version of the fez during the American Civil War.) The Libyan battalions and squadrons of the Italian colonial forces wore lower, red fezzes over white skull caps. Somali and Eritrean regiments in Italian service wore high red fezzes with colored tassels that varied according to the unit. German askaris in East Africa wore their fezzes with khaki covers on nearly all occasions.

The Belgian Force Publique in the Congo wore large and floppy red fezzes similar to those of the French Tirailleurs Senegalais and the Portuguese Companhias Indigenas. The British King's African Rifles (recruited in East Africa) wore high straight-sided fezzes in either red or black, while the West African Frontier Force wore a low red version. The Egyptian Army wore the classic Turkish model until 1950. The West India Regiment of the British Army wore a fez as part of its Zouave-style full dress until this unit was disbanded in 1928. The tradition is continued in the full dress of the band of the Barbados Regiment, with a white turban wrapped around the base.

While the fez was a colorful and picturesque item of uniform, it was in several ways an impractical headdress. If worn without a drab cover, it made the head a target for enemy fire, and it provided little protection from the sun. As a result, it was increasingly relegated to parade or off-duty wear by World War II. However, France's West African tirailleurs continued to wear a khaki-covered version in the field until about 1943. During the final period of colonial rule in Africa (approximately 1945 to 1962), the fez was seen only as a full-dress item in French, British, Belgian, Spanish, and Portuguese African units, being replaced by wide-brimmed hats or forage caps on other occasions. Colonial police forces, however, usually retained the fez as normal duty wear for indigenous personnel.

Post-independence armies in Africa quickly discarded the fez as a colonial relic. It is, however, still worn by the ceremonial Garde Rouge in Senegal as part of their Spahi-style uniform, and by the Italian Bersaglieri in certain orders of dress. The Bersaglieri adopted the fez as an informal headdress through the influence of the French Zouaves, with whom they served in the Crimean War. The Italian Arditi in the First World War wore a black fez that later became a uniform item of the Mussolini Fascist regime. The Spanish Regulares (formerly Moorish) Tabors stationed in the Spanish exclaves of Ceuta and Melilla, in North Africa, retain a parade uniform that includes the fez and white cloaks. Filipino units organised in the early days of U.S. rule briefly wore black fezzes, and officers serving with Muslim personnel of the Philippines Constabulary were authorised to wear this headdress from 1909.
The Liberian Frontier Force, although not a colonial force, wore fezzes until the 1940s.

Bosnian infantry regiments in the former Austro-Hungarian Empire had been distinguished by wearing the fez until the end of World War I. They wore distinctive light blue or field grey uniforms, with a buckle showing an arm with a scimitar inside a shield as the symbol of Bosniak ethnicity. The primarily Bosniak Muslim 13th Waffen Mountain Division of the SS Handschar, which was recruited from Bosnia, used a red or field grey fez with Waffen SS cap insignia during the latter half of World War II.

Two regiments of the Indian Army recruited from Muslim areas wore fezzes under British rule (although the turban was the nearly-universal headdress among Hindu and Muslim sepoys and sowars). A green fez was worn by the Bahawalpur Lancers of Pakistan as late as the 1960s.

Modern use

In Arab countries
In Arab countries, tarboush-making is a profession passed down from parents to children through generations. Producing the hat is tricky and requires a high degree of precision, with many stages in its production cycle. Fewer and fewer people have inherited and continue the profession.

In the Levant (Syria, Lebanon, Palestine, and Jordan), the tarboush is still worn, but it is becoming rarer in recent times, and mostly worn by minstrels, or people who work in the tourist industry in historical places. It is still regarded as traditional Syrian headwear.

However in Morocco the tarboush is still worn as part of everyday attire.

In Southern Asia 
In Hyderabad, the fez is known as the Rumi Topi, which means "Roman Cap" (by virtue of the Ottoman Empire being seen as the successor state of the Eastern Roman Empire). The fez was popularised by Nizam Mir Osman Ali Khan of princely Hyderabad after he visited Rome. As per Himayat Ali Mirza, the great-grandson of the Nizam, Mir Osman Ali Khan never wore expensive clothes but used to wear Rumi Topi to camouflage his short physical stature — he was only five feet tall — and advised his son Moazzam Jah to also wear the Rumi Topi.

The fez was also a symbol of the support for the Ottoman Caliphate against the British Indian Empire during the Khilafat Movement. Later, it became associated with some leaders of the Muslim League, the political party that eventually created the country of Pakistan. The veteran Pakistani politician Nawabzada Nasrullah Khan was one of the few people in Pakistan who wore the fez until his death in 2003.

In Sri Lanka, the fez was frequently worn by the local Muslim Sri Lankan Moor population. Despite its use declining in popularity, the fez is still used in traditional marriage ceremonies. It continues to be worn by "" Sufi path followers. The songkok, a variation of the fez, is worn by the local Sri Lankan Malays.

The name "songkok" is also used in Sumatra and the Malay Peninsula, while in Java, it is called "kopiah"; this headwear is also known widely in Indonesia as "peci", although peci is somewhat different. This hat has been commonly worn in Maritime Southeast Asia since the 19th century, when it was introduced by Muslims from South Asia.

In South Africa
The Turkish-style fez was introduced to Cape Malays in Cape Town, South Africa, by Sheikh Abu Bakr Effendi, when he moved there from Turkey in 1863 to teach them about their religion. Prior to this, the Dutch East India Company had compelled Muslims in the Cape of Good Hope, mainly brought as slaves from what is now Indonesia, to hide their religious practice, with death as the punishment for practising their faith in public or for attempting to convert anyone.

Muslim men have continued to wear the fez there, where it is also referred to as a kofia (also spelt kofija). especially at prayer times in mosques, at weddings, and at home as a sign of respect when in the company of  elderly people. It is also popular with children at madrassas (Islamic schools). However, the last traditional fez-maker in Cape Town retired in March 2022.

The "Silver Fez" is a competition of all-male choirs from the Cape Malay community in Cape Town, involving thousands of musicians and a wide variety of tunes. A documentary film, The Silver Fez, was made about the competition and released in 2009.

Use by fraternal orders
Many fraternal orders are known for wearing fezzes. 
Shriners are often depicted wearing a red fez; the headgear became official for the Shriners in 1872.
Members of the International Order of Alhambra wear a white fez.
Members of the Mystic Order of Veiled Prophets of the Enchanted Realm wear a black fez.
The Knights of Peter Claver wear a blue fez.
Members of the Ancient Mystic Order of Samaritans wear fezzes of various colors, based upon rank.
The Knights of Khorassan wear a navy blue fez.
Members of the Improved Benevolent and Protective Order of Elks of the World wear fezzes of various colors, based upon rank.
The Loyal Order of Moose's second-degree body, the Moose Legion, wear a purple fez.

In popular culture
In the Laurel and Hardy film Sons of the Desert members of the fictional order of the same name wear fezzes, and consequently, so do those of the Laurel and Hardy International Appreciation Society, which is itself named after and modeled on the one seen in the film.

British comedian Tommy Cooper adopted the fez as part of his comic act while serving in Egypt during the Second World War. The hat went on to become Cooper's hallmark, and an icon of 20th century comedy.

See also
 Kalpak, a similar Turkic head cap
 Kopiah
 Kufi, brimless rounded cap 
 List of headgear
 Moorish Science Temple of America, where male members wore fezzes
 Qeleshe, a white rounded cap worn by Albanians
 Songkok, a truncated conical felt hat in Southeast Asia
 Taqiyah, a brimless rounded cap

Footnotes

References

Further reading
 Patricia Baker, "The Fez in Turkey: A Symbol of Modernization?". Costume 20 (1986): 72–85
 Donald Quataert, "Clothing Laws, State, and Society in the Ottoman Empire, 1720–1829". International Journal of Middle East Studies 29, no. 3 (1997): 403–425
 Wilson Chacko Jacob, "Working Out Egypt: Masculinity and Subject Formation Between Colonial Modernity and Nationalism, 1870–1940" (PhD thesis, New York University, 2005), chapter 6 (326–84).

External links
 

Hats
Arabic clothing
Islamic male clothing
Algerian clothing
Tunisian clothing
Ottoman clothing
Moroccan clothing
Turkish clothing
History of Asian clothing
Fascist symbols